The Model 1200 and Model 1300 are two pump-action shotguns that were manufactured by the Winchester-Western Division of Olin Corporation.  It was produced in 12-, 16- and 20-gauge.  The military version of the 1200 has the ability to have a bayonet fixed on the end of the barrel to be used in close quarters combat (CQC).

History
The Winchester Model 1200 was introduced in 1964 as a low-cost replacement for the venerable Model 12. A small number of these weapons were acquired by the United States Army in 1968 and 1969.  The military style Model 1200 was essentially the same weapon as the civilian version, except it had a ventilated handguard, sling swivels, and a bayonet lug. The Model 1200 was succeeded by the Winchester Model 1300 in 1983 when U.S. Repeating Arms Company became the manufacturer of Winchester firearms. Production of the Model 1300 ceased in 2006, when USRAC went bankrupt. The model lives on in the Winchester SXP.

Description
The Winchester Model 1200 came in barrel lengths of 30-inch, and 28-inch with a fixed choke or the Win-choke screw in choke tubes system and is a 12, 16, or 20-gauge, manually operated, slide action shotgun.  The slide action, also known as a pump-action, means that the shotgun has a moving bolt system which is operated by a "wooden or composite slide called the fore-end".  The fore-end is located on the underside of the barrel and moves front to back.  The firearm can hold a maximum of five rounds total with four in the tubular magazine and one in the chamber. The Model 1300 holds 6 2-3/4" shells in the magazine.  It has a hammerless action which means that there is no external hammer spur.  There is an internal hammer which strikes the  firing pin which - in turn - strikes the primer on the shell to ignite the powder in the round.

The Model 1200 was the second shotgun to utilize a rotary bolt with four locking lugs secured within the barrel extension. The AR 17 being the first to use a rotary bolt. The 1200 was Winchester's first shotgun to incorporate the company's patented Winchoke system, a quick change tube to allow the easy replacement of chokes.

Bayonet
A bayonet could be attached to the front end of the barrel of the Military version of the Model 1200. The primary uses of the bayonet on the model 1200 are for close combat, guarding prisoners, and riot duty.  The most commonly used bayonet with the Model 1200 was the M1917 bayonet. After World War I ended, there was a large surplus of the M1917 bayonets because the Army decided to keep the M1903 Springfield as the standard issued rifle. The M1917 bayonet did not fit the Springfield rifles so instead of just getting rid of them, the Army decided to make newer shotguns compatible with the bayonets. Model 1200 shotguns with bayonet lugs and ventilation ribs were still in U.S. Army inventories as late as the 2003 Iraq War. During the Iraq War, the Model 1200 shotguns were phased out in favor of Mossberg 500 shotguns.

Variants
Model 1200: Standard capacity model with four-shell tubular magazine
Model 1200 Defender: Increased capacity model with six-shell tubular magazine (seven 2&3/4" Shells).
Model 1200 Police: Increased capacity variant of the Model 1200 Defender with an electrolysis nickel-plated satin barrel and magazine tube.
Model 1200 Marine: Increased capacity variant of the Model 1200 Defender with an electrolysis nickel-plated polished barrel and magazine tube.
Model 1200 Riot: Standard capacity model with 18.5" barrel and rifle sights. Blued steel barrel and magazine. Marked "Riot" on barrel.
Ted Williams Model 200: Standard Model 1200 marketed by Sears
Model 1200 Hunting: 28-inch barrel with a built-in choke and a five-shell tubular magazine.
Model 1300: Slightly updated version with up to six-shell tubular magazine, now accepts 3" shells
Model 1300 Defender: Increased capacity variants of the Model 1300 with a seven-shell tubular magazine.
Model 1300 Marine: Increased capacity variant of the Model 1300 with an electroless nickel-plated barrel and magazine tube and synthetic stock.
Various Model 1300 variants
Model 2200: Model 1200 with full length stock and barrel, produced for the Canadian firearms market.
Model 120: Budget hardwood stock version marketed at various department stores, such as K-Mart. Birch stock, fixed choke, etc.
Ranger Model 120: Budget hardwood stock version marketed at sporting goods stores, such as Cabelas & K-Mart. Plain stock, Winchoke, etc.

Users

: The Model 1300 Defender is used in small numbers by the Czech Armed Forces.
:Special Forces Brigade
 : since 14 August 1992 until March 2006 Winchester 1300 shotguns were used in private security companies

See also
List of shotguns
FN TPS

References

External links
Model 1200 Field Strip Guide on BATTLETONE.com

Winchester Repeating Arms Company firearms
Pump-action shotguns
Weapons and ammunition introduced in 1968